Ferdinand "Enzo" Pastor (January 24, 1982 – June 12, 2014) was a Filipino racing driver.  Pastor made his racing debut at the 1999 Toyota Corolla Cup with a Toyota Corolla as his first vehicle. Pastor was the first Filipino to have participated in the NASCAR Whelen Euroseries Open Championship race circuit.  Pastor landed on sixth place overall for his first Euroseries Open Championship in 2013 and made one of the fastest laps in the series. Pastor was invited to participate in the K&N Pro Series East.

On June 12, 2014, Pastor died from gunshot wounds after motorcycle-riding gunmen ambushed the truck he rode on in Quezon City, which left his assistant, Paolo Salazar, injured. Pastor was travelling to Clark, Pampanga, in preparation for the final leg of the 2014 Asian V8 Championship Series season.

The Police arrested the suspected mastermind behind the death of Enzo Pastor. Businessman Domingo de Guzman III was arrested on August 26, 2014 in Muntinlupa and was taken into custody at Camp Karingal. Earlier on August 23, suspect and policeman Edgar Angel was arrested and admitted that he was hired by de Guzman to kill Pastor.
 
"Love triangle" is being viewed as a possible motive for the killing. De Guzman allegedly had relations with Enzo Pastor's wife, Dalia Guerrero Pastor. Enzo Pastor's widow was also tagged as a suspect by the police.

Complete motorsports results

NASCAR
(key) (Bold – Pole position awarded by qualifying time. Italics – Pole position earned by points standings or practice time. * – Most laps led.)

Whelen Euro Series - Elite 2

See also
Don Pastor - Enzo's brother, also a race car driver.

References

External links
 Enzo Pastor's profile at the AF3

1982 births
2014 deaths
Deaths by firearm in the Philippines
Sportspeople from Manila
Filipino racing drivers
NASCAR drivers
Asian Formula Three Championship drivers